FK BIP is a Serbian football club based in Čačak, Serbia.

Football clubs in Serbia